Rías Baixas Fútbol Sala was a futsal club based in Pontevedra, Galicia. Rías Baixas was one of the most important futsal clubs from Galicia.

The club was founded in 1975 and its stadium was the ground Pavillón Municipal with capacity of 4,000 seats.

In the 1998–99 and 1999–00 seasons, its main sponsor was the defunct company Fórum Filatélico.

History
The club was founded in 1975. First appearance in national category was in 1990–91 in Primera Nacional B. Two seasons after (1992–93), Rías Baixas achieve the promotion to the División de Plata. As one of the strongest teams of División de Plata, Rías Baixas reach the División de Honor, with only two season in División de Plata. Being sponsored by Fórum Filatélico in 1999–2000 season, the team finished in 16th position, being relegated to División de Plata. But club decides to renounce to this category, and start a new stage in Primera Nacional A. Eventually, the club was disbanded in 2003–04 season playing in Primera Nacional B.

Season to season

5 seasons in División de Honor
2 seasons in División de Plata
2 seasons in 1ª Nacional A
5 seasons in 1ª Nacional B

Trophies
División de Honor: 0
Quarterfinals: 1998–99
Copa de España: 0
Quarterfinals: 1998–99
División de Plata: 1
Winners: 1994–95
Semifinals: 1993–94
Copa División de Plata: 1
Winners: 1994–95
Quarterfinals: 1993–94

References

External links
Profile on LNFS.es

Futsal clubs in Galicia (Spain)
Futsal clubs established in 1975
Sports clubs disestablished in 2004
1975 establishments in Spain
2004 disestablishments in Spain
Pontevedra